Amy E. Aldrich Worth (January 18, 1888 – April 29, 1967) was an American composer, choir director, and organist who was born in St. Joseph, Missouri.

Career
Worth studied music with Jessie Gaynor, Frederick Beale, Mary Lyon and Arthur Garbett, and married Harry Worth on July 1, 1915. She taught piano and worked as an organist and choir director in St. Joseph. Later, she directed the Women's Chorus of the Women's University Club in Seattle, Washington, and was a member of the Seattle Society of Composers. In 1955, she served as the Sigma Alpha Iota National Chair of American Music. Her compositions include:

Piano 
Gavotte Marianne
Purple Heather (two pianos)

Vocal 
Christ Rises (choir)
Evening is Hushed
He Came All so Still (choir)
Israel
Little Lamb
Madrigal
Mary, the Mother (Christmas cantata; choir)
Midsummer
Pierrot (words by Sara Teasdale)
Sing of Christmas (women's choir)
Song of Spring
Song of the Angels
Time of Violets

References

1888 births
1967 deaths
20th-century American composers
American organists
20th-century women composers
Women organists
Choral conductors
Musicians from Missouri
Musicians from Seattle
People from Buchanan County, Missouri